Fratelli detective is an Italian television series.

Plot 
Francesco Forti, Chief Inspector of Police, is passionate about his job but always grappling with difficult cases and with a il-tempered Commissioner. His brother Lorenzo is only eleven years old and has an above-average IQ; with his special intuition, he often ends up helping his older brother in solving the most complicated investigations.

See also
List of Italian television series

External links
 

Italian television series